The 1975–76 British Home Championship was a football tournament played between the British Home Nations at the end of the 1975–76 season. It resulted in an outright Scottish victory following a rare whitewash of all three opponents, including England in a tough final at home in Glasgow. Scotland again refused to travel to Northern Ireland and therefore gained an additional home match. The Scottish team of the middle of the 1970s was one of the best sides the nation has ever fielded, being the only British team to qualify for a major championships between 1971 and 1980. They began well, beating Wales, who also lost to England in the early exchanges. Both title contenders then inflicted heavy defeats on Northern Ireland and both went into the final match looking for a win, as a draw would result in a disappointing tie for first place. The match was full of incident, but the Scots eventually ran out 2–1 winners, taking the cup outright for the first time since the 1967 British Home Championship, when England were World Champions. The Welsh gained some consolation, defeating Northern Ireland in their final match to take third place.

Table

Results

References

External links
Full Results and Line-ups

1976
1976 in British sport
1975–76 in Northern Ireland association football
1975–76 in Welsh football
1975–76 in English football
1975–76 in Scottish football